Dioptis charila is a moth of the family Notodontidae first described by Herbert Druce in 1893. It is found across northern South America and south into the Amazon basin, at least as far as Loreto, Peru.

References

Moths described in 1893
Notodontidae of South America